The Primetime Emmy Awards, or Primetime Emmys, are part of the extensive range of Emmy Awards for artistic and technical merit for the American television industry. Bestowed by the Academy of Television Arts & Sciences (ATAS), the Primetime Emmys are presented in recognition of excellence in American primetime television programming. The award categories are divided into three classes: the regular Primetime Emmy Awards, the Primetime Creative Arts Emmy Awards to honor technical and other similar behind-the-scenes achievements, and the Primetime Engineering Emmy Awards for recognizing significant contributions to the engineering and technological aspects of television. First given out in 1949, the award was originally referred to as simply the "Emmy Award" until the International Emmy Award and the Daytime Emmy Award were created in the early 1970s to expand the Emmy to other sectors of the television industry.

The Primetime Emmy Awards generally air every September, on the Sunday before the official start of the fall television season. Since 1995, the Emmys have been broadcast in rotation among the four major networks (ABC, CBS, FOX, NBC), each network taking turns to air the ceremony every four years. The ceremony is typically moved to late August if it is broadcast by NBC (such as in 2006, 2010, and 2014), so that it does not conflict with NBC's commitment to broadcasting Sunday-night NFL games (due to another conflict, this time with the MTV Video Music Awards, the 2014 ceremony was also shifted to a Monday). The 2018 ceremony, broadcast by NBC, was moved back to September and aired on a Monday.

History 

The Academy of Television Arts & Sciences (ATAS) was founded by Syd Cassyd in 1946. The first Emmy ceremony took place on January 25, 1949, at the Hollywood Athletic Club. Tickets cost $5 and only six awards were presented.

The Emmy statuette was designed by Louis McManus. It depicts a winged muse holding an electron, combining visual metaphors for the arts and sciences. The design for the Emmy statuette was chosen after 47 other designs were rejected. The name "Emmy" comes from the nickname "Immy," used to describe the image-orthicon camera tube that was a significant 1940s technical breakthrough in capturing images for television. Because the statue features a female figure holding an electron, the name "Immy" was feminized to "Emmy."

The Emmys originally honored shows produced and aired locally in the Los Angeles area, but soon expanded into a national event in 1952 to honor shows aired nationwide on broadcast television. Originally, there was only one Emmy event held per year to honor shows nationally broadcast in the United States. In 1968, an "Outstanding Achievement in Daytime Programming" category was added once, but due to voting rules of the time, judges could opt to either award one or no Emmy, and in the end they decided that no one should be nominated. This snub outraged soap opera writer Agnes Nixon, causing her to write in The New York Times, "...after viewing the recent fiasco of the Emmy awards, it may well be considered a mark of distinction to have been ignored by this group." This eventually led to the creation of the separate Daytime Emmy Awards just for daytime programming, run by the sister organization National Academy of Television Arts and Sciences (NATAS).

Cable programs first became eligible for the Primetime Emmys in 1988. Original online-only streaming television programs then became eligible in 2013.

Between 1949 and 2001, voting members had to watch submissions at the ATAS or local hotels. From 2002–2014, members could watch submissions at home on DVDs. Starting in 2015, members could watch submissions through secure online platforms, with DVDs being eliminated in 2020.

In December 2021, the ATAS and NATAS announced major realignments to the Emmy Awards, accounting for the growth of streaming services by aligning their categories and the ceremonies' scopes around factors such as the themes and frequency of such programming, rather than dayparts:

 All categories for scripted comedies and dramas, excluding daytime serial dramas (defined as an episodic, multi-camera drama serial that airs on a weekday basis, or a reboot or spin-off of such a series), and programming targeting viewers 15 and younger (which will fall under the new Children's & Family Emmy Awards debuting in 2022) will fall under the ATAS and Primetime Emmy Awards moving forward, regardless of scheduling.
 Talk shows will be divided between the Daytime and Primetime Emmy Awards based on "format and style characteristics reflective of current programming in the daytime or late night space".
 Awards for morning shows will be moved to the News & Documentary Emmy Awards.
 Categories for game shows and instructional/DIY programming will remain split between the Daytime and Primetime Emmy Awards for 2022, pending realignment in 2023.

Rules
Among the Primetime Emmy Award rules, a show must originally air on American television during the eligibility period between June 1 and May 31 of any given year. In order to be considered a national primetime show, the program must air between 6:00 p.m. and 2:00 a.m., and to at least 50 percent of the country. A show that enters into the Primetime Emmy Awards cannot also be entered into the Daytime Emmy Awards or any other national Emmy competition. For shows in syndication, whose air times vary between media markets, they can either be entered in the Daytime or Primetime Emmy Awards (provided they still reach the 50 percent national reach), but not in both. For game shows that reach the 50 percent threshold, they can be entered into the Daytime Emmy Awards if they normally air before 8 p.m (including the former "access hour" from 7:00 p.m. to 8:00 p.m.); otherwise, they are only eligible for the Primetime Emmy Awards. For streaming television programs, they must be available for downloading or streaming to more than 50 percent of the country, and like shows in syndication they can only enter in one of the national Emmy competitions.

Shows that are offered for pre-sale to consumers, whether on home video devices or via the Web, are ineligible if the pre-sale period starts more than 7 days before the show's initial airing. Also, a show that receives what the academy calls a "general theatrical release" before its first airing (either via television or the Internet) is ineligible. The definition of this phrase excludes limited releases for the specific purpose of award qualification, such as screenings at film festivals or the one-week releases in Los Angeles (and, for documentaries, New York City as well) required for Oscar eligibility.

Entries must be submitted by the end of April, even if a show is not scheduled to originally air until the following month when the eligibility period ends in May. Most award categories also require entries to include DVDs or tape masters of the show. For most series categories, any six episodes that originally aired during the eligibility period must be submitted (programs that were cancelled before airing their sixth episode are thus ineligible). For most individual achievement categories, only one episode is required to be submitted; if an episode is a two-parter, both parts may be included on the submitted DVD.

Ballots to select the nominations are sent to Academy members in June. For most categories, members from each of the branches vote to determine the nominees only in their respective categories (i.e. writers vote for writing awards, actors vote for acting awards). As of July 1, 2021, the various TV industry professions were sorted into 29 Peer Groups. All 16,000 members can vote for nominations in the 14 best program categories (including: Drama Series, Comedy Series, Limited Series, Television Movie, Variety Talk Series, Variety Sketch Series, Competition, and Short Form Series). The final voting poll to determine the winners is held in August, and is done by judging panels. In June, the academy solicits volunteers among its active members to serve on these panels. All active members may serve on the program panels; otherwise they are restricted to those categories within their own branch.

Statuette 

The Primetime Emmy statuette is made of copper, nickel, silver and gold and takes five and a half hours to make. Each Emmy weighs six pounds, twelve ounces.

The number of statuettes given to winners varies by category. All members of a team are not guaranteed their own trophy. However, winners in large teams (such as writers) can purchase their own trophy for an estimated $400.

Categories

Primetime Emmy Awards

The Primetime Emmy Award is awarded in the following categories:

Programs
 Outstanding Comedy Series
 Outstanding Drama Series
 Outstanding Limited or Anthology Series
 Outstanding Reality Competition Program
 Outstanding Scripted Variety Series
 Outstanding Talk Series
 Outstanding Television Movie

Directing
 Outstanding Directing for a Comedy Series
 Outstanding Directing for a Drama Series
 Outstanding Directing for a Limited or Anthology Series or Movie
 Outstanding Directing for a Variety Series

Writing
 Outstanding Writing for a Comedy Series
 Outstanding Writing for a Drama Series
 Outstanding Writing for a Limited or Anthology Series or Movie
 Outstanding Writing for a Variety Series

Acting

Lead actor
 Outstanding Lead Actor in a Comedy Series
 Outstanding Lead Actor in a Drama Series
 Outstanding Lead Actor in a Limited or Anthology Series or Movie

Lead actress
 Outstanding Lead Actress in a Comedy Series
 Outstanding Lead Actress in a Drama Series
 Outstanding Lead Actress in a Limited or Anthology Series or Movie

Supporting actor
 Outstanding Supporting Actor in a Comedy Series
 Outstanding Supporting Actor in a Drama Series
 Outstanding Supporting Actor in a Limited or Anthology Series or Movie

Supporting actress
 Outstanding Supporting Actress in a Comedy Series
 Outstanding Supporting Actress in a Drama Series
 Outstanding Supporting Actress in a Limited or Anthology Series or Movie

Primetime Creative Arts Emmy Awards
The Primetime Creative Arts Emmy Awards are awarded in the following categories (some of which separately recognize work based on whether a single-camera or multi-camera setup was used):

Programs
 Outstanding Documentary or Nonfiction Series
 Outstanding Documentary or Nonfiction Special
 Exceptional Merit in Documentary Filmmaking
 Outstanding Game Show
 Outstanding Hosted Nonfiction Series or Special
 Outstanding Short Form Comedy, Drama or Variety Series
 Outstanding Short Form Nonfiction or Reality Series
 Outstanding Structured Reality Program
 Outstanding Unstructured Reality Program
 Outstanding Variety Special (Live)
 Outstanding Variety Special (Pre-Recorded)

Acting
 Outstanding Character Voice-Over Performance
 Outstanding Guest Actor in a Drama Series
 Outstanding Guest Actor in a Comedy Series
 Outstanding Guest Actress in a Drama Series
 Outstanding Guest Actress in a Comedy Series
 Outstanding Narrator
 Outstanding Actor in a Short Form Comedy or Drama Series
 Outstanding Actress in a Short Form Comedy or Drama Series

Animation
 Outstanding Animated Program
 Outstanding Short Form Animated Program
 Outstanding Individual Achievement in Animation

Casting
 Outstanding Casting for a Comedy Series
 Outstanding Casting for a Drama Series
 Outstanding Casting for a Limited or Anthology Series or Movie
 Outstanding Casting for a Reality Program

Choreography
 Outstanding Choreography for Scripted Programming
 Outstanding Choreography for Variety and Reality Programming

Cinematography
 Outstanding Cinematography for a Limited or Anthology Series or Movie
 Outstanding Cinematography for a Nonfiction Program
 Outstanding Cinematography for a Reality Program
 Outstanding Cinematography for a Series (Half-Hour)
 Outstanding Cinematography for a Series (One Hour)

Commercial
 Outstanding Commercial

Costumes
 Outstanding Contemporary Costumes
 Outstanding Fantasy/Sci-Fi Costumes
 Outstanding Period Costumes
 Outstanding Costumes for a Variety, Nonfiction, or Reality Programming

Directing
 Outstanding Directing for a Documentary/Nonfiction Program
 Outstanding Directing for a Reality Program
 Outstanding Directing for a Variety Special

Hairstyling
 Outstanding Contemporary Hairstyling
 Outstanding Hairstyling for a Variety, Nonfiction or Reality Program
 Outstanding Period and/or Character Hairstyling

Hosting
 Outstanding Host for a Game Show
 Outstanding Host for a Reality or Competition Program

Lighting design / direction
 Outstanding Lighting Design / Lighting Direction for a Variety Series
 Outstanding Lighting Design / Lighting Direction for a Variety Special

Main title design
 Outstanding Main Title Design

Makeup
 Outstanding Contemporary Makeup (Non-Prosthetic)
 Outstanding Makeup for a Variety, Nonfiction or Reality Program
 Outstanding Period and/or Character Makeup (Non-Prosthetic)
 Outstanding Prosthetic Makeup

Music
 Outstanding Music Composition for a Documentary Series or Special
 Outstanding Music Composition for a Limited or Anthology Series, Movie or Special
 Outstanding Music Composition for a Series
 Outstanding Music Direction
 Outstanding Music Supervision
 Outstanding Original Main Title Theme Music
 Outstanding Original Music and Lyrics

Picture editing
 Outstanding Picture Editing for a Comedy Series
 Outstanding Picture Editing for a Drama Series
 Outstanding Picture Editing for a Limited or Anthology Series or Movie
 Outstanding Picture Editing for a Nonfiction Program
 Outstanding Picture Editing for a Structured Reality or Competition Program
 Outstanding Picture Editing for an Unstructured Reality Program
 Outstanding Picture Editing for Variety Programming

Production design
 Outstanding Production Design for a Narrative Contemporary Program (One Hour or More)
 Outstanding Production Design for a Narrative Program (Half-Hour or Less)
 Outstanding Production Design for a Narrative Period or Fantasy Program (One Hour or More)
 Outstanding Production Design for a Variety, Reality, or Competition Series
 Outstanding Production Design for a Variety Special

Sound editing
 Outstanding Sound Editing for a Comedy or Drama Series (One-Hour)
 Outstanding Sound Editing for a Comedy or Drama Series (Half-Hour) and Animation
 Outstanding Sound Editing for a Limited or Anthology Series, Movie or Special
 Outstanding Sound Editing for a Nonfiction or Reality Program (Single or Multi-Camera)

Sound mixing
 Outstanding Sound Mixing for a Comedy or Drama Series (One-Hour)
 Outstanding Sound Mixing for a Comedy or Drama Series (Half-Hour) and Animation
 Outstanding Sound Mixing for a Limited or Anthology Series or Movie
 Outstanding Sound Mixing for a Nonfiction or Reality Program (Single or Multi-Camera)
 Outstanding Sound Mixing for a Variety Series or Special

Special and visual effects
 Outstanding Special Visual Effects in a Season or a Movie
 Outstanding Special Visual Effects in a Single Episode

Stunt coordination
 Outstanding Stunt Coordination for a Comedy Series or Variety Program
 Outstanding Stunt Coordination for a Drama Series, Limited or Anthology Series or Movie
 Outstanding Stunt Performance

Technical direction
 Outstanding Technical Direction, Camerawork, Video Control for a Series
 Outstanding Technical Direction, Camerawork, Video Control for a Special

Writing
 Outstanding Writing for a Nonfiction Programming
 Outstanding Writing for a Variety Special

Primetime Emmy Engineering Awards
The Primetime Engineering Emmy Awards are given specifically for outstanding achievement in engineering. They are presented to an individual, company, or organization for engineering developments so significant an improvement on existing methods or so innovative in nature that they materially affect the transmission, recording, or reception of television. The award, which is television's highest engineering honor, is determined by a jury of highly qualified, experienced engineers in the television industry.

 Engineering plaque
 Engineering certificate
 Outstanding Achievement in Engineering Development (Primetime Emmy statuette)
 Charles F. Jenkins Lifetime Achievement Award
 Outstanding Achievement in Engineering Development
 Philo T. Farnsworth Corporate Achievement Engineering Award

Retired categories
A number of awards have been retired throughout the years, including some that have been replaced by similar award categories in the Daytime Emmy Awards, Sports Emmy Awards, and other areas of recognition:

 Best Live Show
 Best New Program
 Super Emmy Award
 Outstanding Children's Program
 Outstanding Costumes for a Series
 Best Specialty Act – Single or Group
 Outstanding Voice-Over Performance
 Outstanding Art Direction for a Miniseries or Movie
 Outstanding Art Direction for a Single-Camera Series
 Outstanding Cinematography for a Multi-Camera Series
 Outstanding Costumes for a Miniseries, Movie, or Special
 Outstanding Creative Achievement in Interactive Media within a Scripted Program
 Outstanding Creative Achievement in Interactive Media within an Unscripted Program
 Outstanding Hairstyling for a Limited Series or Movie
 Outstanding Hairstyling for a Single-Camera Series
 Outstanding Makeup for a Single-Camera Series (Non-Prosthetic)
 Outstanding Multi-Camera Picture Editing for a Comedy Series
 Outstanding Interactive Program
 Outstanding Short Form Comedy or Drama Series
 Outstanding Short Form Variety Series
 Outstanding Stunt Coordination for a Comedy Series or Variety Program
 Outstanding Variety Series
 Outstanding Individual Performance in a Variety or Music Program
 Program of the Year
 Best Kinescope Show
 Best Sports Coverage
 Best Western Series (1958–59)
 Outstanding Sports Personality
 Outstanding Live Sports Special
 Most Outstanding Live Personality
 Most Outstanding Kinescoped Personality
 Outstanding Classical Music-Dance Program
 Outstanding Program Achievement in Daytime Drama
 Outstanding Program Achievement by Individuals in Daytime Drama

Records

Overall wins for a performer, program, etc.

Most wins for a network in a single year
 CBS – 44 (1974)
 Netflix – 44 (2021)

Most wins for a series in a single year
 Game of Thrones – 12 (2015–2016, 2019)

Most wins for a Comedy Series in single year
 Schitt's Creek – 9 (2020)

Most wins for a Television Program
 Saturday Night Live – 92

Most wins for a Comedy Series
 Frasier – 37

Most wins for a Drama Series
 Game of Thrones – 59

Most wins for a Limited Series
 John Adams – 13

Most wins for a single episode
 "Boardwalk Empire" (Boardwalk Empire) – 6 (2011)
 "Battle of the Bastards" (Game of Thrones) – 6 (2016)

Most wins for a Television Movie
 Behind the Candelabra and Eleanor and Franklin – 11

Most wins for an Animated Program
 The Simpsons – 35

Most wins for a Variety, Music, or Comedy Special
 The Kennedy Center Honors – 16

Most wins for a Variety, Music, or Comedy Series
 Saturday Night Live – 92

Most wins for a Reality-Competition Program
 RuPaul's Drag Race – 24

Most wins for acting in a Comedy Series
 The Mary Tyler Moore Show – 16

Most wins for acting in a Drama Series
 Breaking Bad, The Sopranos, and The West Wing – 9

Most wins for acting in a Limited Series
 Angels in America – 4

Most wins for acting in a Television Movie
 The Glass Menagerie – 4

Most wins for an online-streaming original program
 The Marvelous Mrs. Maisel – 20

Most wins for an Animated Program in a single year
 The Simpsons – 6 (1992)
 Love, Death & Robots – 6 (2021)

Most wins for a performer for the same role in the same series
 Julia Louis-Dreyfus as Selina Meyer for Veep – 6 (2012–2017)

Most wins for Outstanding Host for a Reality or Competition Program
 RuPaul Charles for RuPaul's Drag Race – 6 (2016–2021)

Most wins for Outstanding Drama Series
 Hill Street Blues – 4 (1981–1984)
 L.A. Law – 4 (1987, 1989–1991)
 The West Wing – 4 (2000–2003)
 Mad Men – 4 (2008–2011)
 Game of Thrones – 4  (2015–2016, 2018–2019)

Most wins for Outstanding Comedy Series
 Frasier – 5 (1994–1998)
 Modern Family – 5 (2010–2014)

Most wins for Outstanding Animated Program
 The Simpsons – 11 (1990–1991, 1995, 1997–1998, 2000–2001, 2003, 2006, 2008, 2019)

Most wins for Outstanding Individual Performance in a Variety or Music Program
 Harvey Korman – 4 (1969, 1971–1972, 1974)

Most wins for Outstanding Variety, Music, or Comedy Special
 The Kennedy Center Honors – 7 (1994, 1996, 2009–2013)

Most wins for Outstanding Variety, Music, or Comedy Series
 The Daily Show with Jon Stewart – 11 (2003–2012, 2015)

Most wins for Outstanding Reality-Competition Program
 RuPaul's Drag Race – 24

Most wins for a series for its final season
 Game of Thrones – 12 (2019)

Most wins for a series for its first season
 The West Wing – 9 (2000)

Most wins for a Comedy Series for its final season
 Schitt's Creek – 9 (2020)

Most wins for a Comedy Series for its first season
 The Marvelous Mrs. Maisel – 8 (2018)

Most wins for a Drama Series for its final season
 Game of Thrones – 12 (2019)

Most wins for a Drama Series for its first season
 The West Wing – 9 (2000)

Most wins for an individual in a single year
 Moira Demos – 4 (2016)
 Amy Sherman-Palladino – 4 (2018)
 Dan Levy – 4 (2020)

Most wins for a writer/producer
 Jon Stewart – 22

Most wins for an individual
 Sheila Nevins – 31

Most wins for a person of color
 RuPaul Charles – 11

Most wins for a performer
 Cloris Leachman and Julia Louis-Dreyfus – 8

Most wins for a network
 NBC

Overall nominations for a performer, program, etc.

Most nominations for a network in a single year
 Netflix – 160 (2020)

Most nominations for a Television Program
 Saturday Night Live – 306

Most nominations for a Comedy Series
 Cheers – 117

Most nominations for a Drama Series
 Game of Thrones – 161

Most nominations for a Limited Series
 Roots – 37

Most nominations for a Television Movie
 Grey Gardens – 17
 Eleanor and Franklin – 17
 Bury My Heart at Wounded Knee – 17
 Eleanor and Franklin: The White House Years – 17

Most nominations for an Animated Program
 The Simpsons – 97

Most nominations for a Reality-Competition Program
 Dancing with the Stars – 113

Most nominations for a Variety Series
 Saturday Night Live – 306

Most nominations for a Variety Special
 The Kennedy Center Honors – 59

Most nominations for Outstanding Host for a Reality or Competition Program
 Tom Bergeron – 9
 Heidi Klum – 9

Most nominations for a Comedy Series for its final season
 Schitt's Creek – 15 (2020)

Most nominations for a Comedy Series for its first season
 Ted Lasso – 20 (2021)

Most nominations for a Drama Series for its final season
 Game of Thrones – 32 (2019)

Most nominations for a Drama Series for its first season
 NYPD Blue – 27 (1994)

Most nominations for an individual in a single year
 Louis C.K. – 9 (2013)

Most nominations for an individual
 Lorne Michaels – 94

Most nominations for an individual (actress)
 Cloris Leachman – 22

Most nominations for Outstanding Drama Series
 Law & Order – 11

Most nominations for Outstanding Comedy Series
 Cheers – 11
M*A*S*H – 11

Most nominations for Outstanding Animated Program
 The Simpsons – 30

Most nominations for an online-streaming original program
 The Handmaid's Tale – 75

Most nominations for Outstanding Competition Program
 The Amazing Race – 17

Most nominations for Outstanding Variety Series
 Saturday Night Live – 19

Most nominations for Outstanding Variety Special
 The Kennedy Center Honors – 11

Most nominations for Outstanding Individual Performance in a Variety or Music Program
 Billy Crystal – 12

Most nominations for a Variety Series in a single year
 Saturday Night Live – 22 (2017)

Most nominations for a Reality-Competition Program in a single year
 American Idol (2011), Dancing with the Stars (2009), RuPaul's Drag Race (2018, 2020), and The Voice (2014) – 10

Most nominations for a series without a win in a single year
 The Handmaid's Tale – 21 (2021)

Most nominations for an Animated Program in a single year
 The Simpsons – 9 (1990, 2009)

Most nominations for acting in a series in a single year
 Succession – 14 (2022)

Most nominations for a Comedy Series in a single year
 30 Rock – 22 (2009)

Most nominations for a Drama Series in a single year
 Game of Thrones – 32 (2019)

Most nominations for acting in a Television Movie
 And the Band Played On, The Glass Menagerie, and The Normal Heart – 6

Most nominations for acting in a Variety Special
 Hamilton – 7

Most nominations for acting in a Limited Series
 Roots – 13

See also
 List of Primetime Emmy Award winners
 List of Primetime Emmy Awards ceremonies
 TCA Awards
 Daytime Emmy Awards
 National Television Awards
 Critics' Choice Television Awards
 British Academy Television Awards
 List of American television awards

References

External links
 

 
American annual television specials